Ken Clark (born November 10, 1955) is an American former weightlifter. He competed in the men's heavyweight I event at the 1984 Summer Olympics.

References

External links
 

1955 births
Living people
American male weightlifters
Olympic weightlifters of the United States
Weightlifters at the 1984 Summer Olympics
Sportspeople from San Francisco
Pan American Games medalists in weightlifting
Pan American Games silver medalists for the United States
Weightlifters at the 1987 Pan American Games
20th-century American people
21st-century American people